Just Go with It is a 2011 American romantic comedy film directed by Dennis Dugan, written by Allan Loeb and Timothy Dowling, and produced by Adam Sandler, Jack Giarraputo, and Heather Parry. It is a remake of the 1969 film Cactus Flower, and stars Sandler and Jennifer Aniston, with Nicole Kidman, Nick Swardson, Brooklyn Decker, Bailee Madison, Griffin Gluck, and Heidi Montag in supporting roles. It tells the story of a plastic surgeon who enlists his assistant into helping him woo a sixth-grade math teacher.

Production of the film began on March 2, 2010. The film grossed over $214 million, making it a box office success. However, it received negative reviews, with criticism for its plot and editing but praise for its writing and acting. It won two Golden Raspberry Awards for Worst Actor and Worst Director.

Plot
Danny Maccabee is a successful plastic surgeon in Los Angeles who feigns being in an unhappy marriage to get women, as well as avoid romantic commitment. The only woman aware of his schemes is his office manager/assistant and friend, Katherine Murphy, a divorced mother of two. At a party, Danny tends to a kid's knee scrape, removing his ring to treat the wound. Shortly after, he meets Palmer, a young sixth-grade math teacher. The next morning, after spending the night on the beach together, she finds Danny’s wedding ring in his pocket. She leaves, upset that he cheated on his wife with her.

Instead of telling her the truth, Danny tells her that he is getting divorced from a woman named Devlin because she cheated on him with a man named "Dolph Lundgren". When Palmer insists on meeting Devlin, Danny convinces Katherine to pose as "Devlin" and give them her blessing. However, after hearing Katherine talking on the phone with her kids, Palmer assumes that her kids are Danny's as well. Danny then meets with Katherine's kids, Michael and Maggie, to get them to play along.

The kids blackmail Danny to take them all to Hawaii. At the airport, they are all surprised by Danny's cousin Eddie, traveling in disguise as "Dolph Lundgren" because he is running from his ex-girlfriend's new boyfriend. To maintain the lies, Danny and Katherine are forced to bring him along.

At the resort in Hawaii, Katherine and Danny run into the real-life Devlin Adams and her husband Ian Maxtone-Jones. Over time, Katherine is impressed by Danny and his way with her kids.

Devlin invites Katherine and Danny out to dinner. Palmer suggests that she and Danny get married now since a drunken Eddie told her about Danny's plans of engagement. Danny and Katherine are both surprised by her proposition, but Danny agrees.

Palmer confronts Katherine about Danny's feelings for her, which Katherine dismisses. Katherine runs into Devlin at a bar and admits that she pretended to be married to Danny to avoid embarrassment. Devlin confesses that she is divorcing Ian. Katherine confides in Devlin about being in love with Danny, but then Danny shows up behind her, saying that he is not marrying Palmer and that he is deeply in love with Katherine. Palmer meets a professional tennis player who shares her interests. Danny and Katherine get married.

Cast

 Adam Sandler as Dr. Daniel "Danny" Maccabee
 Jennifer Aniston as Katherine Murphy
 Nicole Kidman as Devlin Adams 
 Nick Swardson as Eddie Simms
 Brooklyn Decker as Palmer Dodge
 Bailee Madison as Maggie Murphy
 Griffin Gluck as Michael Murphy
 Dave Matthews as Ian Maxtone-Jones
 Rachel Dratch as Kirsten Brant
 Kevin Nealon as Adon
 Heidi Montag as Kimberly
 Minka Kelly as Joanna Damon
 Rakefet Abergel as Patricia
 Dan Patrick as Tanner Patrick
 Mario Joyner as Henderson
 Keegan-Michael Key as Ernesto
 Allen Covert as Brian (Soul Patch)
 Andy Roddick as himself 
 Jake Shimabukuro as ukulele player

Reception

Box office
Just Go with It grossed $103 million in the U.S. and Canada and $111.9 million in other territories for a worldwide gross of $214.9 million.

The film topped its opening weekend box office with $30.5 million.  The biggest market in other territories being Russia, where it grossed $13,174,937.

Critical response
Just Go with It received generally negative reviews. On Rotten Tomatoes, the film has an approval rating of 19%, based on 138 reviews, with an average rating of 3.9/10. The site's consensus reads: "Just Go with It may be slightly better than some entries in the recently dire rom-com genre, but that's far from a recommendation." On Metacritic, the film has a score of 33 out of 100, based on 31 critics, indicating "generally unfavorable reviews".  Audiences polled by CinemaScore gave the film an average grade of "B" on an A+ to F scale.

The Telegraph named Just Go with It in its "ten worst films of 2011" list, saying it is "a crass and overpopulated remake of Cactus Flower, served up as a mangy romcom of serial deceptions." Christopher Orr of The Atlantic noted that "the title itself seems a plea for audiences' forbearance" and is part of a disappointing trend involving "the reimagining of good, if perhaps not quite classic, films associated with the latter 1960s and early 1970s." Entertainment Weekly'''s Lisa Schwarzbaum wrote that Just Go With It "is saved from utter disaster, though, by Jennifer Aniston" who has "expert comic timing" and "plays like a grown-up."

Nicole Kidman was praised by critics as the sole bright spot.

Accolades

Home media
Sony Pictures Home Entertainment released Just Go with It'' on DVD and Blu-ray disc on June 7, 2011. As of 2019, it has grossed $25,014,665 in North America DVD sales.

References

External links

 
 
 
 
 
 

2010s English-language films
2011 films
2011 romantic comedy films
Remakes of American films
American romantic comedy films
Columbia Pictures films
Films scored by Rupert Gregson-Williams
Films about families
Films about vacationing
Films based on adaptations
Films directed by Dennis Dugan
Films produced by Adam Sandler
Films set in 1988
Films set in 2011
Films set in California
Films set in Hawaii
Films set in Los Angeles
Films set in Long Island
Films with screenplays by Allan Loeb
Golden Raspberry Award winning films
Happy Madison Productions films
2010s American films